
Gmina Jutrosin is an urban-rural gmina (administrative district) in Rawicz County, Greater Poland Voivodeship, in west-central Poland.

Villages
Apart from the town of Jutrosin, Gmina Jutrosin contains the villages and settlements of Bartoszewice, Bębina, Bielawy, Bonowo, Borek, Domaradzice, Dubin, Grąbkowo, Janowo, Jeziora, Katarzynowo, Nadstaw, Nowy Sielec, Ochłoda, Ostoje, Pawłowo, Piskornia, Płaczkowo, Rogożewo, Śląskowo, Stary Sielec, Stasin, Szkaradowo, Szymonki, Wielki Bór, Zaborowo, Zmysłowo, Żydowski Bród and Zygmuntowo.

Neighbouring gminas
Gmina Jutrosin is bordered by the gminas of Cieszków, Kobylin, Miejska Górka, Milicz, Pakosław, Pępowo and Zduny.

References
Polish official population figures 2006

Jutrosin
Rawicz County